AESD may refer to:
 Adelanto Elementary School District
 Association of Engineering and Shipbuilding Draughtsmen
 Atwater Elementary School District